Groupies - Jitashou  is Cheer Chen's third studio album, released by Rock Records in 2002. It was listed in the Top 200 Mandarin Albums by the Taiwanese Musician Institute.

Track listing
Miss Paranoid (我親愛的偏執狂; wŏ qīn ài de piān zhí kuáng)
Too Smart (太聰明; tài cōng ming)
A Little Step (小步舞曲; xiăo bù wŭ qŭ)
1234567
Say Something (隨便說說; suí biàn shuō shuō)
In My Closet (guitar) (躺在你的衣櫃; tǎng zài nǐ de yī guì)
A Practice 
Groupies (吉他手; jí    tā shŏu)
Black Eyes (黑眼圈; hēi yăn quān)
Enemy (就算全世界與我為敵; jiù suàn quán shì jiè yú wŏ wéi dí)
Metaphor (小塵埃; xiăo chén āi)
Unavailable (不應該; bù yīng gāi)
In My Closet (piano) (躺在你的衣櫃; tǎng zài nǐ de yī guì)

References

2002 albums
Cheer Chen albums